Famerin is a village in Milajerd Rural District, Milajerd District, Komijan County, Markazi Province, Iran. At the 2006 census, its population was 690, in 173 families.

References 

Populated places in Komijan County